La Cepeda is an ancient historical region in the landlocked Province of León, Spain. It borders with La Maragatería, El Bierzo, Omaña and La Vega del Órbigo. It is a traditional comarca without administrative recognition.

Municipal terms 
Quintana del Castillo
Magaz de Cepeda
Villagatón
Villamejil
Villaobispo de Otero

External links 
La Maragatería y Cepeda
La Cepeda
La Comarca de la Cepeda, León
La Crónica de León - Inaugurado el parque de La Cepeda en honor a la comarca